Gjergj Fishta (23 October 187130 December 1940) was an Albanian Franciscan friar, poet, educator, politician, rilindas, translator and writer. He is regarded as one of the most influential Albanian writers of the 20th century due to his epic masterpiece Lahuta e Malcís and the editor of two of the most authoritative magazines after Albania's independence, Posta e Shypniës and Hylli i Dritës.

Notably being the chairman of the commission of the Congress of Manastir, which sanctioned the Albanian alphabet, he was part of the Albanian delegation to the Versailles Conference, 1919. In 1921 he was a member and became the deputy chairman of the Albanian parliament, later on in the '20s and the '30s he was among the most influential cultural and literary figures in Albania. After the communist regime came to power, his literary oeuvre had been taken out of circulation and it stayed so until the fall of communism.

Biography

Early life 

Gjergj Fishta was born to a Catholic family in Fishtë, of the Zadrima region, then Ottoman Empire, to Ndoka and Prenda Kaçi. Baptised by the name Zef, the youngest of three brothers and one sister. The parish priest of Troshan, parish where Fishta was included, Marian Pizzochini of Palmanova, asked his parents to make him a friar. At the expense of the parishioner, Zef went to the Franciscan school in Shkodra until 1880, when Troshan's College began its activity. He studied philosophy and Catholic theology in Bosnia (seminaries in Kraljeva Sutjeska, Franciscan monastery in Livno, Franciscan monastery in Kreševo), among Bosnian Catholics.In 1902, he became the head of the Franciscan college in Shkodër. Fishta was under influence of Croatian Franciscan friars as a student in monasteries in Austria-Hungary, when he wrote his main work Lahuta e Malcís, influenced by the national epics of the Croatian and Serbian literature according to Robert Elsie. Dedicated to the commander Ali Pasha of Gusinje the work was an epic poem that consisted of 30 cantos focusing on the events of the League of Prizren, which had become a symbol of the Albanian national awakening.

He interpreted Albania in the conference of Paris on 1919. From the beginning of April 1919 to 1920, he served as Secretary of the Albanian delegation to the Paris Peace Conference. At the end of 1920, he was elected to parliament by Shkodër, and in 1921 he became the Vice President of the Albanian parliament. In 1924, Fishta supported Fan Noli in his attempt to found a democratic system in Albania. After the establishment of the Zogu regime, Fishta left willingly to go into exile in Italy in 1925/26, before he resumed his position as teacher and writer in Shkodër, where he died in 1940.

Literary works 

In 1899, Fishta, along with Preng Doçi and Ndre Mjeda founded the Shoqnia e bashkimit të gjuhës shqipe (Society for the Unity of the Albanian Language) literary society, usually known as the Shoqnia Bashkimi (The Union Society), or simply Bashkimi (The Union) of Shkodra for publishing Albanian language books. In the late Ottoman period Fishta's publications included folk songs and a number of poems, which like other Albanian publications of the time often had to be published abroad and smuggled into the empire to avoid censorship.

In 1907, Fishta wrote the satirical work The Wasps of Parnasus that critiqued Albanians of the time that placed individual interests 
over national ones and the intelligentsia who did not devote themselves to studying the Albanian language and showed disdain toward it. As a representative of the Society for the Unity of the Albanian Language, Fishta participated and was elected for president of the committee in the Congress of Monastir (today Bitola in North Macedonia, then Ottoman Empire) held in 1908. Participants of the congress accepted Fishta's proposal for the Latin Bashkimi alphabet, and many of its elements were merged into the Istanbul alphabet resulting in the standard Albanian alphabet. In 1916, he was core founder of the Albanian Literary Commission, where he unsuccessfully tried to place Shkodra subdialect as standard literary Albanian.

Through both his work as a teacher as well as through his literary works, Fishta had a great influence on the development of the written form of his native Gheg Albanian. Fishta worked also as a translator (of Molière, Manzoni, Homer, et al.).

Critic 

Robert Elsie hypothesized that in Lahuta e Malcís, Fishta substituted the struggle against the Ottomans with a struggle against the Slavs, after the recent massacres and expulsions of Albanians by their Slavic neighbours. After World War II the authorities in Yugoslavia and Albanian historiography controlled by communist regime in Tirana (influenced by Yugoslav communists) proscribed Fishta's works as anti-Slavic propaganda.

According to Arshi Pipa, Fishta's satirical works are modulated after the Bejte tradition of Shkodër, which he elevated to a literary level.

Legacy

Awards in his lifetime 
In the last years of the Ottoman rule over Albania, proposed by the wali of Shkodër Hasan Riza Pasha he was awarded with the Maarif Order of 2nd class (tr. Maarif Nişanı, Order of Education) for his contribution in the local education. He was awarded with the Order of Franz Joseph from Austro-Hungarian Empire authorities, later on in 1925 with the Medaglia di Benemerenza by the Holy See. On 1931 by the Order of the Phoenix by Greece, and after the Italian invasion of Albania he was part of the Royal Academy of Italy.

Historical 
In Soviet historiography he was referred to as "former agent of Austro-Hungarian imperialism" who took position against Slavic people and Pan-Slavism because they opposed "rapacious plans of Austro-Hungarian imperialism in Albania" and had a role in Catholic Clergy's preparation "for Italian aggression against Albania".

Bibliography 

 Lahuta e Malcís, epic poem, (Zara, 1902)
 Anzat e Parnasit, satire, (Sarajevo,  1907)
 Pika voese republished afterwards and retitled Vallja e Parrizit, (Zara, 1909)
 Shqiptari i qytetnuem, melodrama, (1911)
 Vëllaznia apo Shën Françesku i Assisi-t, (1912)
 Juda Makabe, tragedy, (1914)
 Gomari i Babatasit, (Shkodër, 1923)
 Mrizi i Zanave, (Shkodër, 1924)
 Lahuta e Malcís (2d. ed.), Gesamtdruck, (Shkodër 1937). In English The Highland Lute, trans. by Robert Elsie and Janice Mathie-Heck. I. B. Tauris (2006)

Sources 

 Maximilian Lambertz: Gjergj Fishta und das albanische Heldenepos "Lahuta e Malsisë" – Laute des Hochlandes. Eine Einführung in die albanische Sagenwelt. Leipzig 1949.

References

Citations

Sources

External links 
 Biography of Gjergj Fishta

1871 births
1940 deaths
People from Lezhë County
Activists of the Albanian National Awakening
Albanian-language poets
Albanian-language writers
20th-century Albanian poets
20th-century Albanian writers
Albanian translators
Italian–Albanian translators
Albanian schoolteachers
Albanian Catholic poets
19th-century Albanian poets
19th-century Albanian politicians
20th-century Albanian politicians
Albanian Franciscans
French–Albanian translators
Knights of the Order of Franz Joseph
Recipients of the Order of the Phoenix (Greece)
People from Scutari vilayet